Fuck Me, Ray Bradbury is a 2010 Internet music video that was nominated for a 2011 Hugo Award for Best Dramatic Presentation, Short Form. The video features singer and comedian Rachel Bloom performing a sexually explicit song about her lust and admiration for writer Ray Bradbury.

The music and lyrics were written by Bloom and the music video was directed by Paul Briganti. The song was produced by Jack Dolgen and Jon Siebels, with additional arrangements by Dolgen. The video's cinematographer was Paul Rondeau and the choreographer was Katie Lee Hill.

Bradbury's response
On Bradbury's 90th birthday, Mark Edward visited Bradbury's home and showed him the video. He reported that Bradbury "was charmed by the whole thing", and that he watched it with a "wise old knowing gleam in his eyes" and "a few soft chuckles."

Further reading

References

External links

Ray Bradbury
2010s music videos
Cultural depictions of writers
Cultural depictions of American men
2010s English-language films